Pakubuwono XII (also transliterated Pakubuwana XII; Surakarta, April 14, 1925 – Surakarta, June 11, 2004) was the twelfth Susuhunan (ruler of Surakarta) and the longest ruling of all monarchs in Surakarta history.

He reigned under Japanese occupation during the Second World War, and through the Sukarno and Suharto eras; in effect, three eras in which traditional Javanese power had been both respected and challenged.

Towards the end of his reign, he was able to stake  the claim of his palaces' context in the modern Indonesia by the publication of Karaton Surakarta: A Look into the Court of Surakarta Hadiningrat, Central Java which was published in the same year of his death.

Early life 
Born as Raden Mas Soerjo Goeritno (Javanese script: ꦫꦢꦺꦤ꧀ꦩꦱ꧀ꦯꦸꦂꦪꦓꦫꦶꦠ꧀ꦤ), he was the son of Pakubuwono XI and his queen consort, Kanjeng Raden Ayu Koesparijah (styled Gusti Kanjeng Ratu Pakubuwono). RM. Soerjo Goeritno also had a half-sister namely Gusti Raden Ayu Koes Saparijam (styled GKR. Kedaton).

In his childhood, RM. Soerjo Goeritno was educated in an Europeesche Lagere School (Dutch primary school) near Pasar Legi, Surakarta. He was nicknamed Bobby by his friends. Some of his uncles, who were the same age as him, were also educated in this school. RM. Soerjo Goeritno was a friendly pupil and had a close friendship with his classmates without considering his social status. Since his childhood, he was fond of studying Javanese classical dances, especially Handaga and Garuda dances. He often recited Quran with Mr. Tjondrowijoto, a teacher in Mambaul Ulum. He also liked archery. In 1938, RM. Soerjo Goeritno was forced to quit his education for 5 months, as he must follow his father who was mandated by Pakubuwono X, his grandfather, to leave for the Netherlands with other local monarchs in Dutch East Indies to attend 40th jubilee of Queen Wilhelmina's coronation.

After that, RM. Soerjo Goeritno continued his education in Hogereburgerschool te Bandoeng (now  SMA Negeri 3 Bandung and SMA Negeri 5 Bandung) with some uncles. After being schooled for 2 years, Pacific War broke out, in which Armed Forces of the Empire of Japan won against Allies of World War II, then Dutch East Indies fell to Empire of Japan.

Pakubuwono XI asked him to leave Bandung for Surakarta. On June 1, 1945, his father died. According to Javanese tradition, the heir must be the Pakubuwono XI's eldest son, Kanjeng Gusti Pangeran Haryo Mangkoeboemi. However, the opportunity was closed as his mother, GKR. Kentjana (the first wife of Pakubuwono XI), had died in 1910, so she couldn't be appointed as queen consort when her husband was crowned. RM. Soerjo Goeritno subsequently became the heir despite being the youngest son, proven with the fact that he didn't attend his father's funeral in Imogiri, in accordance with the tradition that an heir was prohibited to attend his predecessor's funeral.

Before ascending to the throne, RM. Soerjo Goeritno was appointed as heir apparent, styled KGPH. Poerbojo. Another version relates that his appointment was closely related to the role played by Sukarno, future President of Indonesia. RM. Soerjo Goeritno was chosen as Pakubuwono XII because of his young age and ability to adapt to a new situation. Although a new king had been agreed on, a new problem emerged. His coronation plan was once opposed by the Japanese colonial government, who stated that they didn't dare to guarantee the safety of future king.

Rule

War of Independence 
RM. Soerjo Goeritno was crowned as Pakubuwono XII on June 11, 1945, approximately 2-months before Independence of Indonesia. Due to his young age, he was often accompanied by his mother, GKR. Pakubuwono (popularly known as Ibu Ageng or Great Mother), in carrying out his daily duties. Pakubuwono XII was often nicknamed as Sinuhun Hamardika, because he became the first Susuhunan of Surakarta who reigned in independence era.

After Proclamation of Independence, on September 1, 1945, he and Mangkunegara VIII separately issue royal decrees which congratulated to the newly founded Republic of Indonesia, 4 days before Hamengkubuwono IX and Paku Alam VIII's decree. On September 6, 1945, Surakarta Sunanate and Duchy of Mangkunegaran were granted Special Region's Charter from President Sukarno.

During Indonesian War of Independence, Pakubuwono XII was awarded titular military rank of lieutenant-general from President Sukarno, which meant he often accompanied the president to observe battlefields. Between October 12–13, 1945, Pakubuwono XII even led an assault on the headquarters of Kenpeitai in Kemlayan (now in Serengan subdistrict) and Timuran (now in Banjarsari subdistrict). He also led an assault on the headquarters of Kido Butai in Mangkubumen (now in Banjarsari subdistrict).

The Netherlands who didn't consent to Indonesian independence attempted to violently seize their former colony. In January 1946, the capital of Indonesia was moved to Yogyakarta because Jakarta had been occupied by the Dutch. At that time, Indonesian government was led by Sutan Syahrir as prime minister, with Sukarno as head of state. As commonly occurred in a country, an opposition faction who did not support the governmental system of PM Syahrir emerged, for example the group of General Soedirman.

As Yogyakarta became a capital, Surakarta which had been an old rival became a center of opposition. The radicals namely Barisan Banteng (meaning "Ox Front" in Indonesian) led by Muwardi deliberately abducted Pakubuwono XII and Sutan Syahrir as a protest against the government of Indonesia.

Barisan Banteng successfully took control of Surakarta without being eradicated by the Indonesian government due to Gen. Soedirman's protection. Gen. Sudirman even successfully persuaded the government to abolish the special status of Surakarta. From June 1, 1946, Sunanate of Surakarta was only a residency within Central Java province. The government was held by civilians, while Pakubuwono XII was merely symbolic.

Independence era 
In his early rule, Pakubuwono XII was viewed as a ruler who failed in taking an important role and using the political situation of Indonesia, which caused his prestige to be lower than that of Hamengkubuwono IX of Yogyakarta.

Pakubuwono XII had actually attempted to regain the special status of Surakarta. On January 15, 1952, Pakubuwono XII  explained extensively about Special Region of Surakarta to the ministerial council in Jakarta. On that occasion, he explained that the government of the special region couldn't overcome unrest and gnawing with armed threat, while the government of a special region didn't have power apparatus. However, the attempt was unsuccessful. Eventually, Pakubuwono XII left the palace to attend education in Jakarta in 1954. He appointed his uncle, KGPH. Koesoemojoedo, as his temporary representative.

In his reign, there were two catastrophes in Surakarta Palace. On November 19, 1954, the tallest building in the palace complex, Panggung Sangga Buwana, was burned and most of the building, including the roof and decoration in the top of building, was destroyed. On January 31, 1985, the core of palace was burned down at 9.00 pm. The fire happened in Sasana Parasdya, Sasana Sewaka, Sasana Handrawina, Dalem Ageng Prabasuyasa, Dayinta, and Paningrat. The entire building, including the furnitures, was completely destroyed.

On February 5, 1985, Pakubuwono XII told President Soeharto about the fire in Surakarta Palace. The president reacted by forming Committee 13 who was tasked to rehabilitate the palace. Hardjonagoro, a national cultural observer who was also Pakubuwono XII's friend, was one of the member of Committee 13. Surakarta Palace was fully rehabilitated after obtaining 4 million rupiahs from the government. The renovation of palace complex was finished and it was inaugurated in 1987.

On September 26, 1995, by Presidential Decree no. 70/SKEP/IX/1995, Pakubuwono XII was awarded Struggle Prize and Medal of Generation '45 from central government. The award was given as a form of honor for Pakubuwono XII as the first king in Indonesia to swear allegiance and stand behind the republic government in the early independence era. Pakubuwono XII also voluntarily contributed a half of his personal and royal wealth to central government in that era.

Although in his early reign, Pakubuwono XII was politically less successful, he still became the patron figure of Javanese culture. In reformation era, many national figures, such as President Abdurrahman Wahid, still respected him as elder of Java.

Death and succession
In the middle of 2004, Pakubuwana fell into coma and underwent intensive care in Panti Kosala Dr. Oen Hospital, Surakarta. Eventually, Pakubuwono XII was pronounced dead on June 11, 2004. At the same time of the death of Pakubuwono XII, 2004 Indonesian presidential election took place in Surakarta.

Upon his death in 2004, there was no clear heir as there was no official queen installed. Two of his sons who were half-brothers claimed the throne.

The older, Hangabehi, took control of the kraton (palace) and expelled his younger half-brother Tedjowulan. Each had himself crowned and they held separate tomb-sealing rituals for their father.

Family consensus has now acknowledged that Hangabehi is the rightful heir and is now titled SISKS Pakubuwono XIII. On July 18–19, 2009, there was a ceremony in the kraton where the enthronement anniversary was conducted with the sacred Bedoyo Dance performed for the ceremony. The attendees consisted of various local and foreign dignitaries as well as Hangebehi's half-brother Tedjowulan.

In 2017, further developments of crowning Pakubuwono XIII resolved the 13-year long dispute.

Family

Wives
 KRAy. Mandojoningroem
 KRAy. Rogasmoro
 KRAy. Pradoponingroem
 KRAy. Koesoemaningroem
 KRAy. Retnodiningroem
 KRAy. Poedjoningroem

Children
 Gusti Raden Ayu Koes Handawijah/GKR. Alit
 Gusti Raden Mas Surjo Partono/KGPH. Hangabehi (later Susuhunan Pakubuwono XIII)
 GRM. Surjo Suprapto/KGPH. Hadi Prabowo
 GRAy. Kus Supijah/GKR. Galuh Kentjana
 GRM. Surjono/KGPH. Puspo Hadikusumo
 GRAy. Kus Rahmanijah
 GRAy. Kus Saparnijah
 GRAy. Kus Handarijah/GKR. Sekar Kentjana
 GRAy. Kus Kristijah
 GRAy. Kus Sapardijah
 GRAy. Kus Raspijah
 GRM. Surjo Suseno/KGPH. Kusumojudho
 GRAy. Kus Sutrijah
 GRAy. Kus Isbandijah/GKR. Retno Dumilah
 GRM. Surjo Sutedjo/KGPH. Tedjowulan
 GRM. Surjo Bandono/KGPH. Puger
 GRAy. Kus Partinah
 GRM. Surjo Suparto/KGPH. Dipokusumo
 GRM. Surjo Saroso
 GRM. Surjo Bandrijo/KGPH. Benowo
 GRAy. Kus Niyah
 GRM. Surjo Sudhiro/Gusti Pangeran Haryo Notokusumo
 GRM. Surjo Suharso/GPH. Madukusuma
 GRM. Surjo Sudarsono/GPH. Widjojo Sudarsono
 GRAy. Kus Murtijah/GKR. Wandansari
 GRAy. Kus Sabandijah
 GRAy. Kus Trinijah
 GRAy. Kus Indrijah/GKR. Aju
 GRM. Surjo Sutrisno/GPH. Surjo Witjaksono
 GRM. Nur Muhammad/GPH. Tjahjoningrat
 GRAy. Kus Suwijah
 GRAy. Kus Ismanijah
 GRAy. Kus Samsijah
 GRAy. Kus Saparsijah
 GRM. Surjo Wahono/GPH. Surjo Mataram

Military honours 
 Titular rank of lieutenant-general (November 1, 1945)
 Satyalencana Perang Kemerdekaan I (August 17, 1958)
 Satyalencana Perang Kemerdekaan II (August 17, 1958)
 Award for Building Service of Indonesian War Force, issued by President Sukarno on October 5, 1958
 Heroic Decoration in Guerilla Struggle in Defending Independence, issued by President Sukarno on November 10, 1958
 Awarded Indonesian Veteran Card on June 8, 1968.

References

Literature
 Ricklefs MC. 2001. A History of Modern Indonesia: 3rd Edition. Palgrave and Stanford University Press.
 Purwadi. 2007. Sejarah Raja-Raja Jawa. Yogyakarta: Media Ilmu.

External links
 "Solo Journal; The Coffee Shop King, 80, With Ladies in Waiting," NY Times December 5, 2002, by Jane Perlez

1925 births
2004 deaths
Burials at Imogiri
Susuhunan of Surakarta
Indonesian royalty